Robert Charles Wallace (born October 7, 1945 in Texarkana, Arkansas) is a former American football wide receiver and tight end in the National Football League. He was drafted by the Chicago Bears in the second round of the 1968 NFL Draft. He played college football at Texas-El Paso.

1945 births
Living people
American football wide receivers
American football tight ends
Chicago Bears players
People from Texarkana, Arkansas
Players of American football from Arkansas
UTEP Miners football players